Thea Gabriele von Harbou (27 December 1888 – 1 July 1954) was a German screenwriter, novelist, film director, and actress. She is remembered as the screenwriter of the science fiction film classic Metropolis (1927) and for the 1925 novel on which it was based. Harbou collaborated as a screenwriter with film director Fritz Lang, her husband, during the period of transition from silent to sound films.

Early life, family, and education
Thea von Harbou was born in Tauperlitz (now part of Döhlau), Bavaria, in 1888, into a family of minor nobility and government officials, which gave her a level of sophisticated comfort. As a child, she was educated in a convent by private tutors who taught her several languages as well as piano and violin. She was a child prodigy. 

Her first works, a short story published in a magazine and a volume of poems published privately, focused on perceptions of art, subjects considered unusual for a girl of thirteen. Despite her privileged childhood, Harbou wanted to earn a living on her own, which led her to become an actress despite her father's disapproval.

From novelist to screenwriter
After her debut in 1906, Harbou met Rudolf Klein-Rogge and married him during World War I. By 1917, she and Klein-Rogge had moved to Berlin where Harbou devoted herself to building her career as a writer. She was drawn to writing epic myths and legends with an overtly nationalistic tone. In one historian's estimation: "Her novels became patriotic and morale-boosting, urging women to sacrifice and duty while promoting the eternal glory of the fatherland".

Her first close interaction with cinema came when German director Joe May decided to adapt a piece of her fiction, Die heilige Simplizia. From that moment forward, "Her fiction output slowed down. In short order she would become one of Germany's most celebrated film writers, not only because of her partnership with Fritz Lang, but also for writing scripts for F. W. Murnau, Carl Dreyer, E. A. Dupont, and other German luminaries".

Her brother, Horst von Harbou, worked for UFA as a photographer and began to work closely with Thea and Fritz Lang on many of their most famous productions.

Partnership with Lang
Thea von Harbou's first collaboration with Fritz Lang was marked by a common interest in India. As Harbou worked on an adaptation of her novel Das indische Grabmal (The Indian Tomb, 1918), Joe May assigned Lang to help her write the screenplay and work out production details. Praising Harbou's skills, Erich Kettelhut recalled: "She was not only well-liked by her colleagues, but also as much a creative force, as highly motivated and smoothly efficient, as her husband. Her loving personality was crucial to the professional teamwork. Harbou's ability to reach out to people and find compromise in the worst situations was a vital resource."

Harbou and Lang began an affair during this time; she divorced Klein-Rogge in 1920. Following the success of Dr. Mabuse der Spieler (Dr. Mabuse the Gambler) and the death of Lang's first wife, the couple married in 1922. They worked on a script that would reflect their pride in their German heritage, Die Nibelungen (1924), and enhance Harbou's reputation as a writer for the screen. She became known for her unique habit of wearing the same dress throughout filming, even as she cooked hot meals for the crew during late nights. Visitors remembered Harbou taking charge of all the domestic and social responsibilities when visiting the couple's apartment. During this time of poverty in 1920s Germany, Harbou became active in acquiring food for her film crew, as one friend recalled, "She was even able to talk the UFA into carrying the costs so the crew could get their meals for free ... she stood there on the rough floor of that drafty shed for hours and didn't mind peeling potatoes or cleaning vegetables with the other women. Such was the spirit of sacrifice."

Harbou often developed her screenplays into full-length novels, with their publication scheduled to coincide with the release of the film, though this was not the case with Metropolis (1927). Harbou was a central player in producing Metropolis, and this epic became significant. Besides writing the novel and the screenplay, and developing the distinct moral ending of Metropolis, she discovered Gustav Fröhlich, who played the lead role of Freder Fredersen.

Her next major collaboration with Lang was M (1931), a film about a child murderer. It was written with exquisite attention to accuracy. Lang and Harbou had been enthralled with news coverage of Peter Kürten, known as the Monster of Düsseldorf, during the late 1920s. She used newspaper articles in developing the script and "maintained regular contact with the police headquarters on Alexanderplatz and was permitted access to the communications and secret publications of Berlin's force". Recalling the script, Harbou's secretary Hilde Guttmann later said, "I saw many other film manuscripts, but never one which could compare with the manuscript for M. Two typewriter ribbons were stuck together to give us three colors: one black and red, and the other blue. The camera work and the action were typed in black, the dialogue blue, and the sound, where synchronized, was typed in red". Harbou received no credit as the script writer for M.

She was also involved in politics, joining the campaign against Germany's paragraph 218, which made abortion a crime. At a mass rally in 1931, she said:

Divorce
Shortly after Harbou married Lang, he developed the habit of openly pursuing younger women, but they nevertheless presented themselves as a happy couple with a contented home that would have seemed like a small museum of exotic art for the common citizen. Then, during the production of Das Testament des Dr. Mabuse, Lang discovered Harbou in bed with Ayi Tendulkar, an Indian journalist and student 17 years younger than her.

After Lang and Harbou's divorce became final on 20 April 1933, the couple slowly lost contact with each other. Shortly after the divorce, Harbou and Ayi Tendulkar contracted a secret marriage, because the Nazi state did not permit someone of her public stature to marry a dark-skinned Indian.

Under Nazi rule
With Adolf Hitler's rise to power in 1933, the German film industry began to be used for propaganda purposes. Harbou was loyal to the new regime. Around 1934, a year after the Nazi Party came to power, on her own initiative she wrote and directed two films, Elisabeth und der Narr and Hanneles Himmelfahrt. However, she did not find the experience of directing satisfactory and remained a prolific scenarist during this time. "Under a regime where every film was a 'state film,' Thea von Harbou amassed writing credits on some twenty-six films, while giving uncredited assistance on countless others-including a handful with an indisputable National Socialist worldview".

After World War II

From July to October 1945, Thea von Harbou was held in Staumühle, a British prison camp. Though many have asserted she had significant Nazi sympathies, Harbou claimed she only joined the Nazi Party to help Indian immigrants in Germany, like her husband. Lang's biographer, Patrick McGilligan, wrote: "Her direct work on behalf of the government consisted, she claimed, entirely of volunteer welding, making hearing aids, and emergency medical care. In fact, she received a medal of merit for saving people in two air raids." In prison, she directed a performance of Faust and when released she worked as a Trümmerfrau (rubble woman) in 1945 and 1946.

Death
Toward the end of Harbou's life, pain from high blood pressure, migraines, and neuralgia weakened her, although she continued to write or dictate from her bed. After attending a showing of Der müde Tod (Destiny, 1921)
as a guest of honor in 1954, she fell and suffered a hip injury. On 1 July 1954, she died in hospital at the age of sixty-five.

Several years after her death, Lang directed the film The Indian Tomb (1959), based upon one of Harbou's novels.

Filmography

The Passion of Inge Krafft, directed by Robert Dinesen (1921, based on an idea by Thea von Harbou)
, directed by Friedrich Feher (1921, based on the novel Das Haus ohne Tür und Fenster)
The Indian Tomb, directed by Joe May (1921, based on the novel Das indische Grabmal)
The Stone Rider, directed by Fritz Wendhausen (1923, based on an idea by Thea von Harbou)
Metropolis, directed by Fritz Lang (1927, based on the novel Metropolis)
Spione, directed by Fritz Lang (1928, based on the novel Spione)
Woman in the Moon, directed by Fritz Lang (1929, based on the novel The Rocket to the Moon)

Screenwriter 
 The Legend of Holy Simplicity (dir. Joe May, 1920)
 The Wandering Image (dir. Fritz Lang, 1920)
 The Women of Gnadenstein (dir. Robert Dinesen and Joe May, 1921)
 Four Around a Woman (dir. Fritz Lang, 1921) - Screenplay based on a play by Rolf E. Vanloo
 Destiny (dir. Fritz Lang, 1921)
 The Indian Tomb (dir. Joe May, 1921)
 The Burning Soil (dir. F. W. Murnau, 1922)
 Dr. Mabuse the Gambler (dir. Fritz Lang, 1922) - Screenplay based on Dr. Mabuse by Norbert Jacques
 Phantom (dir. F. W. Murnau, 1922) - Screenplay based on a novel by Gerhart Hauptmann
 Princess Suwarin (dir. Johannes Guter, 1923) - Screenplay based on a novel by Ludwig Wolff
 The Expulsion (dir. F. W. Murnau, 1923) - Screenplay based on a play by 
 The Grand Duke's Finances (dir. F. W. Murnau, 1924) - Screenplay based on a novel by Frank Heller
 Die Nibelungen—Part 1: Siegfried (dir. Fritz Lang, 1924) - Screenplay based on the Nibelungenlied
 Die Nibelungen—Part 2: Kriemhild's Revenge (dir. Fritz Lang, 1924) - Screenplay based on the Nibelungenlied
 Michael (dir. Carl Theodor Dreyer, 1924) - Screenplay based on a novel by Herman Bang
 Chronicles of the Gray House (dir. , 1925) - Screenplay based on a novella by Theodor Storm
 Metropolis (dir. Fritz Lang, 1927)
 Spione (dir. Fritz Lang, 1928)
 Woman in the Moon (dir. Fritz Lang, 1929)
 M (dir. Fritz Lang, 1931)
 The First Right of the Child (dir. Fritz Wendhausen, 1932)
 The Marathon Runner (dir. E. A. Dupont, 1933) - Screenplay based on a novel by Werner Scheff
 The Testament of Dr. Mabuse (dir. Fritz Lang, 1933) - Screenplay based on Dr. Mabuse by Norbert Jacques
 Hanneles Himmelfahrt (dir. Thea von Harbou, 1934) - Screenplay based on The Assumption of Hannele by Gerhart Hauptmann
 What Am I Without You (dir. Arthur Maria Rabenalt, 1934)
 Elisabeth and the Fool (dir. Thea von Harbou), 1934)
 Princess Turandot (dir. Gerhard Lamprecht, 1934) - Screenplay based on Turandot
 The Old and the Young King (dir. Hans Steinhoff, 1935)
 An Ideal Husband (dir. Herbert Selpin, 1935) - Screenplay based on An Ideal Husband by Oscar Wilde
 I Was Jack Mortimer (dir. Carl Froelich, 1935) - Screenplay based on I Was Jack Mortimer by Alexander Lernet-Holenia
 Der Mann mit der Pranke (dir. Rudolf van der Noss, 1935) - Screenplay based on a novel by 
 The Impossible Woman (dir. Johannes Meyer, 1936) - Screenplay based on a novel by Mia Fellmann
 Escapade (dir. Erich Waschneck, 1936) - Screenplay based on My Official Wife by Richard Henry Savage
 A Woman of No Importance (dir. Hans Steinhoff, 1936) - Screenplay based on A Woman of No Importance by Oscar Wilde
 The Ruler (dir. Veit Harlan, 1937) - Screenplay based on a play by Gerhart Hauptmann
 Don't Promise Me Anything (dir. Wolfgang Liebeneiner, 1937) - Screenplay based on a play by Charlotte Rissmann
 The Broken Jug (dir. Gustav Ucicky, 1937) - Screenplay based on The Broken Jug by Heinrich von Kleist
 Mother Song (dir. Carmine Gallone, 1937)
  (dir. Veit Harlan, 1938) - Screenplay based on a play by Max Halbe
 The Woman at the Crossroads (dir. Josef von Báky, 1938) - Screenplay based on a novel by 
 Covered Tracks (dir. Veit Harlan, 1938) - Screenplay based on a radio drama by Hans Rothe
  (dir. Josef von Báky, 1939)
 Hurrah! I'm a Father (dir. Kurt Hoffmann, 1939)
 Lauter Liebe (dir. Heinz Rühmann, 1940)
 Wie konntest Du, Veronika! (dir. Milo Harbich, 1940)
  (dir. Jürgen von Alten, 1940) - Screenplay based on a novel by F. B. Cortan
 Clarissa (dir. Gerhard Lamprecht, 1941) (uncredited)
  (dir. Josef von Báky, 1941) - Screenplay based on a play by 
 With the Eyes of a Woman (dir. Karl Georg Külb, 1942) - Screenplay based on a novel by Zsolt Harsányi
 Maria Malibran (dir. Guido Brignone, 1943)
 Gefährtin meines Sommers (dir. Fritz Peter Buch, 1943) - Screenplay based on a novel by 
  (dir. Georg Jacoby, 1943) - Screenplay based on two plays by 
 A Wife for Three Days (dir. Fritz Kirchhoff, 1944) - Screenplay based on a novel by 
 Via Mala (dir. Josef von Báky, 1945) - Screenplay based on Via Mala by John Knittel
 Journey to Happiness (dir. Erich Engel, 1944/1948)
  (dir. Ulrich Erfurth, 1944/1950)
 A Day Will Come (dir. Rudolf Jugert, 1950) - Screenplay based on a novella by Ernst Penzoldt
 Dr. Holl (dir. Rolf Hansen, 1951)
 Your Heart Is My Homeland (dir. Richard Häussler, 1953) - Screenplay based on a novel by Irmgard Wurmbrand

Director 
 Elisabeth and the Fool (1934)
Hanneles Himmelfahrt (1934)

Remakes 
The Tiger of Eschnapur (1938) – remake of The Indian Tomb (1921)
The Indian Tomb (1938) – remake of The Indian Tomb (1921)
M (1951) – Remake of M (1931)
The Tiger of Eschnapur (1959) – remake of The Indian Tomb (1921)
The Indian Tomb (1959) – remake of The Indian Tomb (1921)
 Das Testament des Dr. Mabuse (1962) – remake of The Testament of Dr. Mabuse (1933)

Books
Wenn's Morgen wird, 1905
Weimar: Ein Sommertagstraum, verse stories 1908
Die nach uns kommen, a village novel, 1910
Von Engeln und Teufelchen, ten stories, 1913
Deutsche Frauen. Bilder stillen Heldentums, five stories, 1914
Der unsterbliche Acker, a war novel, 1915
Gold im Feuer, novel, 1915
Der Krieg und die Frauen, eight stories, 1915
Die Masken des Todes. Sieben Geschichten in einer, 1915
Die Flucht der Beate Hoyermann, 1916
Die Deutsche Frau im Weltkrieg, essays, 1916
Aus Abend und Morgen ein neuer Tag, 1916
Du junge Wacht am Rhein!, 1917
Adrian Drost und sein Land, 1918
Das indische Grabmal (The Indian Tomb), 1918
Der belagerte Tempel, 1917
Die nach uns kommen, 1918
Legenden, five stories (including Holy Simplicity), 1919
Sonderbare Heilige, ten stories, 1919
Die unheilige Dreifaltigkeit, 1920
Das Haus ohne Tür und Fenster, 1920
Gute Kameraden, 1920
Gedichte, 1920
Das Nibelungenbuch, 1924
Mondscheinprinzeßchen, 1925
Metropolis, 1926
Der Insel der Unsterblichen, 1926
Mann zwischen Frauen, 1927
Frau im Mond, 1928
Spione, 1929
Du bist unmöglich, Jo!, novel, 1931
Liebesbriefe aus St. Florin; Novella, 1935
Aufblühender Lotos, 1941
Der Dieb von Bagdad, 1949
Gartenstraße 64, 1952

References

Bibliography

Further reading
Thea von Harbou - AMC Movie Guide
Joyless Streets: Women and Melodramatic Representations in Weimar Germany by Patrice Petro
Writing, Scratching, and Politics from M to Mabuse in Qui Parle by Dana Stevens
In the Shadow of Freedom by Ayi Tendulkar's daughter Laxmi Tendulkar Dhaul née Laxmi Thea Tendulkar

External links

Thea von Harbou at the Women Film Pioneers Project

20th-century German actresses
20th-century German screenwriters
20th-century German women writers
1888 births
1954 deaths
Bavarian nobility
Film people from Bavaria
German film actresses
German science fiction writers
German silent film actresses
German stage actresses
German women screenwriters
Nazi propagandists
Nobility in the Nazi Party
People from Hof (district)
People from the Kingdom of Bavaria
Women film pioneers
Women in Nazi Germany
Women science fiction and fantasy writers